The following highways are numbered 539:

Canada
Alberta Highway 539
 Ontario Highway 539
 Ontario Highway 539A

India
 National Highway 539 (India)

United States